Afterlife is the fourth studio album by Swedish power metal band Nocturnal Rites, released in 2000.

Track listing
All music and lyrics by Nocturnal Rites

 "Afterlife"  – 5:26
 "Wake Up Dead"  – 3:48
 "The Sinner's Cross"  – 3:47
 "Hell and Back"  – 3:39
 "The Sign"  – 3:50
 "The Devil's Child"  – 3:18
 "Genetic Distortion Sequence"  – 4:01
 "Sacrifice"  – 3:21
 "Temple of the Dead"  – 4:47
 "Hellenium"  – 4:46

Personnel
 Jonny Lindkvist – vocals
 Nils Norberg – lead guitar, guitar synthesizer and effects
 Fredrik Mannberg – guitar
 Mattias Bernhardsson – keyboards
 Nils Eriksson – bass
 Owe Lingvall – drums

References

2000 albums
Nocturnal Rites albums
Century Media Records albums